The Sanko Grand Summer Championship was a professional golf tournament that was held in Japan during the 1990s. It was an event on the Japan Golf Tour from 1995 to 1998. It was played in August at the Sanko 72 Country Club in Takasaki, Gunma Prefecture.

Winners

References

External links
Coverage on Japan Golf Tour's official site

Former Japan Golf Tour events
Defunct golf tournaments in Japan
Sport in Gunma Prefecture
Recurring sporting events disestablished in 1998